The With Anticipation Stakes is a Grade III American Thoroughbred horse race for two-year-olds over a distance of  miles on the turf track scheduled annually in end of August or early September at Saratoga Race Course in Saratoga Springs, New York.

History
The race is named in honor of George W. Strawbridge Jr.'s outstanding turf runner, With Anticipation who won the Grade I Sword Dancer Stakes twice at Saratoga.

The event was inaugurated on 3 September 2005 with the second favorite Stream Cat, ridden by US Hall of Fame jockey Gary Stevens winning by  lengths in a time of 1:45.

The event was classified as a Grade III race in 2009, the American Graded Stakes Committee upgraded it to Grade II for 2011. In 2017 the event was downgraded to Grade III. The 2020 running was taken off the turf and run on a sloppy dirt track with four starters which resulted in an automatic downgrade to a Listed event.

The race is currently part of the Breeders' Cup Challenge series.  The winner will automatically qualify for the Breeders' Cup Juvenile Turf.

The 2007 winner Nownownow went on to win the inaugural Breeders' Cup Juvenile Turf at Monmouth Park.

Records
Speed  record: 
 1:40.94 – Catholic Boy (2017)

Margins:
  lengths – Startup Nation (2014)

Most wins by an owner:
 2 – Fab Oak Stable (2005, 2007)
 2 – Klaravich Stables & William Lawrence  (2012, 2014)
 2 – Three Chimneys Farm (2016, 2020)

Most wins by a jockey:
 3 – Javier Castellano (2013, 2016, 2018)

Most wins by a trainer:
 6 – Todd Pletcher (2008, 2009, 2013, 2015, 2016, 2018)

Winners

Legend:

See also
List of American and Canadian Graded races

References

2005 establishments in New York (state)
Horse races in New York (state)
Saratoga Race Course
Flat horse races for two-year-olds
Turf races in the United States
Graded stakes races in the United States
Grade 3 stakes races in the United States
Recurring sporting events established in 2005